Leones F.C., also known as Itagüí Leones, is a professional Colombian football team based in Itagüí playing in the Categoría Primera B starting from 2019. They play their home games at the Estadio Metropolitano Ciudad de Itagüí.

History 
Founded as Deportivo Rionegro in 1944, Leones Fútbol Club participated in all seasons of the Categoría Primera B from 1991 to 2017, when the team was runner-up of the tournament and was promoted to Categoría Primera A for the first time.

The team played for almost forty years in the amateur league. The team's first president was Libardo Sanchez and his first manager was Alfonso Piedrahita. Thanks to its performances and achievements in the 80s the club was admitted in the first edition of the Categoría Primera B, the second-tier of the professional Colombian league, played in 1991. In 1993, with the direction of manager Carlos Augusto Navarrete, Rionegro managed to be among the five best of the tournament. The team got its best performance in 2001, when they were runners-up under the direction of manager Orlando Restrepo.

In 2008 Deportivo Rionegro, with René Higuita as their captain and star and with Óscar Aristizábal as manager, managed to win the first tournament of the year, defeating Unión Magdalena in the final, but in the second half failed to reach the final, so they had to fight for the title of the Primera B against Real Cartagena, losing on aggregate by 2-4. They played the promotion matches against Envigado F.C., but lost by a score of 3-1 on aggregate. In 2014 Deportivo Rionegro moved to Bello and changed its name to Leones Fútbol Club. The following year they moved to Turbo where they stayed for another year before moving back to the Medellín metropolitan area in 2016, establishing themselves in Itagüí.

Leones ended as runners-up in the 2017 Primera B, winning the Torneo Finalización and then going on to lose the final to Boyacá Chicó on penalty kicks. However, since they ended the season as the best team in the aggregate table, they earned promotion to the Categoría Primera A for the 2018 season, the first time the team played in the first division. They were relegated back to Primera B at the end of the season, finishing in bottom place of the relegation table.

Stadium

Honours
Categoría Primera B:
Runners-up (1): 2017

Players

Current squad

Notable players

 Iván Córdoba (1993–95)
 Samuel Vanegas (1996)
 Vladimir Marín (1999–01)
 Neider Morantes (2005)
 René Higuita (2008–09)
 Jefferson Duque (2010–12)

External links

Leones FC page on DIMAYOR.com

References

Football clubs in Colombia
Association football clubs established in 1944
1944 establishments in Colombia
Categoría Primera B clubs